Television in Saudi Arabia was introduced in 1965, but is now dominated by just five major companies: Middle East Broadcasting Center, SM Enterprise TV, Lebanese Broadcasting Corporation, Rotana and Saudi TV. Together, they control 80% of the pan-Arab broadcasting market.   Saudi Arabia is a major market for pan-Arab satellite and pay-TV. Saudi investors are behind the major networks MBC, which is based in Dubai, and Emirates based OSN. The Saudi government estimated that in 2000 the average Saudi spent 50% to 100% more time watching television than his or her European or US counterpart. On average, 2.7 hours are spent daily watching TV in Saudi Arabia.

The pay-TV market in Saudi Arabia is big, with a penetration estimated at 21%. beIN Sports is one of the largest pay-TV players in terms of subscriptions, with a market share of 59%.

History
The first television broadcasts in Saudi Arabia originated from a 200-watt television station, AJL-TV, "The Eye of the Desert". These were English-language programs for the personnel of the USAF Dhahran Airfield, and started on 17 June 1955. The programming was from contemporary American television, but all references to Christianity, Israel or alcohol were edited out. In September 1957, ARAMCO began a television service for its 9,000 employees in Dhahran; that service would cease operations on 31 December 1998. The first state owned television channel Al Saudiya would launch on 7 July 1965.

Nawal Baksh was the first Saudi woman to appear on Saudi television, in 1966.

Prior to the introduction of satellite broadcasting, Saudi TV channels One and Two had a reach of 60% of the adult Saudi population. The exception was with regard to Eastern Province audiences who traditionally tuned into Bahrain TV.

Arab satellite first became available in 1985 with the launching of Arabsat, but it was not until the 1990s that satellite television became commercially viable. Accessibility of Western entertainment and news programs had a profound effect, as the foreign programs were instantly popular, leading Saudi TV to respond with more programs, including a live political talk show in which senior officials responded to questions by viewers.

The first private satellite channel in the Arab world, the Middle East Broadcasting Centre, was founded in 1991. In the early 1990s, King Fahd began to invest in the television business through Abdul Aziz Al Ibrahim and Khalid Al Ibrahim, the brothers of Al-Johara, his favourite wife. Other private channels soon followed, led for the most part by Saudis and Lebanese. By 2003, there were 15 private Arab satellite television channels, four of them owned by Saudis.

By the mid-2000s, many women presented shows on Saudi television. After trials in 2004 and 2005 in Jeddah, Digital Terrestrial Television launched in July 2006 and covered five major cities. To continue DTT transition and extend the service across the Kingdom, the Ministry of Culture and Information signed a contract with Thomson in May 2008. By 2010, its network of 100 digital terrestrial broadcasting towers covered nearly 90% of the population. However, probably due to the adoption of multichannel TV on satellite, the uptake of DTT remains limited; in 2012 it was estimated at 1% of total households.

State-managed stations 
The terrestrial broadcast sector in Saudi Arabia is state-owned through the Ministry of Media. The state-run Broadcasting Services of the Kingdom of Saudi Arabia operates almost all domestic broadcasting outlets. State-run television consists of four channels: Saudi One, the main channel in Arabic launched in 1963; Saudi Two, an English language channel; Al Riyadiah, a sports channel; and the news channel Al Ekhbariya.

Government-owned terrestrial television has changed little since 1969. Its programming is still predominantly focused on educational, entertainment, and religious subjects. Reruns of Arabic-language cinema, particularly Egyptian movies, are also broadcast. Political content other than official government announcements has remained relatively limited.

Programming
Kalam Nawaaem, a popular female-hosted Arabic talkshow discussing various societal topics, and Arab Idol, both showing on MBC, are the most popular TV programs in Saudi Arabia. Sada Al Malaeb, a sports talkshow, is the third preferred show. Turkish drama series also capture a strong following.

Most-viewed channels
Average daily reach, total Arab population, September 2021

List of channels
AlArabiya
Alhadath
Asharq News
MBC1
MBC2
MBC3
MBC4
MBC Max
MBC Drama
AlSaudiya
SBC
Thikrayat TV
Quran TV
Sunna TV 
SSC | 1
SSC | 2
SSC | 3
SSC | 4
SSC | 5
SSC | 6
SSC | 7
SSC | 8 
KSA Sports 1  
KSA Sports 2
ISA Sports 3
KSA Sports 4
Iqraa TV
Rotana Clip
Rotana Khalijiah
Rotana comedy 
Rotana Drama
Rotana Cinema 
Rotana Kids
Rotana Music

See also

 Lists of television channels
 Censorship in Saudi Arabia#Film and television
 Takki Series (Saudi Arabia)

References

 
Television stations